Czeluścin  is a village in the administrative district of Gmina Pępowo, within Gostyń County, Greater Poland Voivodeship, in west-central Poland.

The village has an approximate population of 256.

References

Villages in Gostyń County